Tetiana Luzhanska and Coco Vandeweghe were the defending champions, but Luzhanska chose not to participate. Vandeweghe competed with Mashona Washington, but lost in the first round to Elizabeth Lumpkin and Ioana Raluca Olaru.

Jamie Hampton and Ajla Tomljanović won the title defeating Maria Sanchez and Yasmin Schnack in the final 3–6, 6–3, [10–6].

Seeds

Draw

Draw

References
 Main Draw

Goldwater Women's Tennis Classic - Doubles